Kulcha were an Australian R&B band formed in 1993 by four vocalists Joe Fidow, Richard Matila, Eric Palu and Jay Whitmore. They have Samoan or Māori ancestry. They released two studio albums, Kulcha (September 1994) and Take Your Time (May 1997), the former reached No. 13 in Australia and No. 5 in New Zealand. Their top 10 singles are "Shaka Jam" in both markets, and "Don't Be Shy" and "Fly Girl" in New Zealand.

At the ARIA Music Awards of 1995 their self-titled album was nominated for Best Pop Release and "Shaka Jam" was nominated for the Highest Selling Single. Their songs featured on episodes of TV series, Heartbreak High, in 1994, 1995 and 1997.

History 

The four members of Kulcha, Joe Fidow, Richard Matila, Eric Palu and Jay Whitmore were all raised in New Zealand but formed their R&B band in Sydney in 1993. They have Māori or Samoan ancestry. Kulcha issued their debut single, "Shaka Jam", in May 1994 via East West Records. It was recorded at Mo Brown Studios with Matthew O'Connor producing. It had been broadcast on Australian Broadcasting Corporation (ABC)'s programme, Blackout, series 6, episode 3, which aired in December 1993. It reached No. 7 on the ARIA Singles chart and No. 8 in New Zealand.

Their songs featured on episodes 15 and 38 in Season 1 (1994) of TV series, Heartbreak High with "Shaka Jam", "Spend the Night", "Don't Be Shy" and "Fly Girl"; episode 62 of Season 2 (1995) with "Nasty" and episode 157 of Season 6 (1997) with "Do You Like It?".

Band members

Joe Fidow
Richard Matila
Eric Palu
Jay Whitmore

Discography

Albums

Singles

Awards and nominations

ARIA Music Awards
The ARIA Music Awards is an annual awards ceremony that recognises excellence, innovation, and achievement across all genres of Australian music. They commenced in 1987. 

|-
| rowspan="2"| 1995
| rowspan="1"| "Shaka Jam"
| Highest Selling Single
| 
|-
| rowspan="1"| Kulcha
| Best Pop Release
| 
|-

References

Australian contemporary R&B musical groups